Canet Roussillon Football Club is an association football club based in Canet-en-Roussillon, France. It was founded in 1934. The club currently plays in Championnat National 2

History
The club was founded in 1934 as Club Olympique Perpignanais.

In the 2020–21 Coupe de France, Canet Roussillon pulled off an upset victory by beating Ligue 1 giants Marseille, advancing to the round of 16 after a 2–1 win. They were eliminated in the quarter-final of the competition by Montpellier.

In August 2021, Athlon CIF, an Australian fund, invested in Canet Roussillon, injecting €1.5 million into the club. This more than doubled the club's budget.

Historical names 
 Club Olympique Perpignanais (1934–1949)
 Stade Olympique Perpignanais (1949–1952)
 Perpignan Football Club (1952–1997)
 Sporting Perpignan Roussillon (1997–2001)
 Perpignan Football Catalan (2001–2002)
 Perpignan Canet Football Club (2002–2014)

Current squad

Former players 

  Krzysztof Iwanicki

References

Association football clubs established in 1934
Sport in Pyrénées-Orientales
1934 establishments in France
Football clubs in Occitania (administrative region)